Six Points About Emma is a 2011 Spanish comedy-drama film directed by . It stars Verónica Echegui as Emma, a selfish and manipulative blind woman hellbent on getting pregnant, alongside Fernando Tielve and Álex García.

Plot 
The plot follows Emma, a blind woman about to turn 30 who leaves her boyfriend over the latter's inability to produce her a child. To that end, she hooks up with Germán, a psychiatrist running a therapy for the disabled who is also taking advantage of her, videotaping their sexual activities. Nonetheless, love eventually shows up.

Cast

Production 
The screenplay was penned by Roberto Pérez Toledo and Peter Andermatt. The film was produced by La Mirada Producciones, Canarias Cultura en Red, and Generación 78 in association with Televisión Canaria. Shooting began on 29 November 2010. It was shot in Tenerife, including the Hospital Universitario de Canarias' consultation facilities.

Release 
A pre-screening in Lanzarote, Tenerife and Gran Canaria was scheduled for 25 November 2011. The film was also included in the lineup of the 15th Málaga Film Festival's Zonacine section. Distributed by Alta Classics, the film received a wide theatrical release in Spain on 11 May 2012.

Reception 
Pere Vall of Fotogramas rated the film 3 out of 5 stars, highlighting Echegui and her acting flexibility as the best thing about the film.

Sergio F. Pinilla of Cinemanía rated the film 3½ out of 5 stars, considering that Pérez Toledo "reveals himself as a wonderful scriptwriter and director of actors", "gifted with a special sensitivity to dissect human relationships".

Lluís Bonet Mojica of La Vanguardia wrote that the film, "far from stereotypical, and with remarkable performances, it falters at the end".

See also 
 List of Spanish films of 2012

References 

Spanish comedy-drama films
Films shot in the Canary Islands
2011 films
2010s Spanish-language films
2011 comedy-drama films
Films about blind people
2010s Spanish films